Liaquatabad Railway Station is an abandoned railway station on Karachi Circular Railway loop line in Sharifabad, neighborhoods of Liaquatabad Town in Karachi, Pakistan. This railway station used for KCR trains from 1969 to 1999.

Possible re-opening
The station might re-open if a planned re-opening of the KCR loop as a rapid transit scheme goes ahead.

See also
 List of railway stations in Pakistan
 Pakistan Railways

References

External links

Railway stations in Karachi
Liaquatabad Town
Railway stations on Karachi Circular Railway